Bassim Abdul-Hassan  (born 17 January 1974) is an Iraqi former football defender who played for Iraq at the 2001 FIFA World Youth Championship.

Abdul-Hassan made 5 appearances for the national team in 2001.

References

Iraqi footballers
Iraq international footballers
Living people
Association football midfielders
1974 births